Vegard Thune (born 26 August 1951) is a Norwegian politician for the Conservative Party.

He served as a deputy representative to the Norwegian Parliament from Oppland during the term 1989–1993. In total he met during 24 days of parliamentary session.

References

1951 births
Living people
Conservative Party (Norway) politicians
Deputy members of the Storting
Oppland politicians
Place of birth missing (living people)
20th-century Norwegian politicians